Carpetbagger is an alt-country, Americana band based in Austin, Texas. The band was formed in spring of 2012. Carpetbagger consists of lead vocalist and guitarist Greg Loftus, lead guitarist Cody Brown, bassist John Tranum, and drummer Bryan McGrath.

History
In 2011, Greg Loftus moved from Boston, Massachusetts to Austin, Texas and started the band a year later. The band released its first EP titled “Far Off The Daybreak Call” on August 2, 2013. The album was named after the last stanza of Walt Whitman's poem "O Pioneers". Far Off The Daybreak Call was recorded live over a weekend at Loftus' house in Austin. Kevin McCann recorded drums on the EP. Ben Ballinger and Christy Hays were guest vocalists on the EP. The band's first performance as Carpetbagger with the Far Off The Daybreak Call lineup was at SXSW 2013 on 6th Street. Carpetbagger had residencies at Scoot Inn, Hole in the Wall, and Blackheart.

Discography

EP

References

Musical groups from Austin, Texas
American alternative country groups